Sir John Cochrane Moore AC (5 November 191530 August 1998) was an Australian jurist.  In 1973 he became the presiding judge of the Australian Conciliation and Arbitration Commission. Under the Australian system, this commission served as both an arbitrator in labour disputes and as a court for the enforcement of certain provisions of the Commonwealth's labour laws.

He was knighted in 1976 for "distinguished service to law", and appointed a Companion of the Order of Australia in 1986.

See also
 Judiciary of Australia

References

Sources
 

1915 births
1998 deaths
20th-century Australian judges
Australian Presbyterians
Australian Knights Bachelor
Companions of the Order of Australia
People educated at North Sydney Boys High School